The Cima Coppi is the title given to the highest peak in the yearly running of the Giro d'Italia, one of cycling's Grand Tour races. The mountain that is given this title each year awards more mountains classification points to the first rider than any of the other categorized mountains in the race.

History
The categorization was first introduced for the 1965 Giro d'Italia in honor of the late Fausto Coppi who won five editions of the Giro d'Italia and three mountain classification titles during his career. It was first announced on 22 April 1965 by then race director Vincenzo Torriani that the highest peak would award two times as many mountains classification points. Torriani thought of possibly awarding time bonuses to the first to summit the mountain; however, after many dissenting opinions, he opted to award more mountains classification points.

The Cima Coppi changes from year to year, depending on the altitude profile of the Giro d'Italia, but the Cima Coppi par excellence is the Stelvio Pass, which at 2758m is the highest point ever reached by the Giro. The Stelvio has been used in the 1972, 1975, 1980, 1994, 2005, 2012, 2014, 2017 and 2020 editions. It was also scheduled in 1965, 1988, and 2013, but in each case the course was modified due to weather conditions, with various effects on the Cima Coppi designation.

List

Multiple winners

The following riders have won the Cima Coppi on 2 or more occasions.

Winners by nationality

Riders from eleven different countries have won the Cima Coppi.

See also
 Souvenir Henri Desgrange – a similar award given in France's Grand Tour, the Tour de France.

References

Footnotes

Citations

Bibliography

Giro d'Italia
Cycling awards
Climbs in cycle racing in Italy